Carlo Lacana (born November 11, 1998) is a Filipino actor.

Career 
Lacana is a child actor in Laoag City, Ilocos Norte Province, who started his career with commercial television and print ads. His first movie was "Tall As Trees" in March 2008 with Chin-Chin Gutierrez, Brent David Fraser, and Monsour Del Rosario, produced and directed by Gil Ponce in Seattle, Washington. Lacana appeared in these Filipino television shows: Captain Barbell as young Teng (GMA). Kamandag (GMA) as the Hostaged Kid, Lastikman as young Ken (ABS-CBN).

Filmography

Television

Film

External links
 

1998 births
Living people
Filipino male child actors
Star Magic
People from Laoag